Maria Guinot (20 June 1945 – 3 November 2018) was a Portuguese singer, best known for her participation in the 1984 Eurovision Song Contest.

Biography
Born in Barreiro, Portugal, Guinot released two EPs, "La mère sans enfant" and "Balada do negro só" in the late 1960s, then took a long break from the music industry.  She returned in 1981 performing a song, "Um adeus, um recomeço", in the Portuguese Eurovision selection, Festival da Canção, where she finished third. Her second attempt in Festival da Cançao came in 1984, when her song "Silêncio e tanta gente" ("Silence and So Many People") emerged the winner. Guinot went forward as the Portuguese representative in the 29th Eurovision Song Contest, held in Luxembourg City on 5 May.  "Silêncio e tanta gente", a reflective ballad with Guinot accompanying herself on piano, was performed last in the running order, and provided a low-key ending to the contest.  It finished in 11th place of the 19 entries.

Following her Eurovision appearance, Guinot continued performing and composing.  She has released three albums, and has often collaborated on projects with other musicians.

In 2010 she suffered three strokes and stopped playing the piano. Maria Guinot died on 3 November 2018 from a lung infection at the age of 73.

Albums discography
1987: Esta palavra mulher
1991: Maria Guinot
2004: Tudo passa

References

 

1945 births
2018 deaths
Eurovision Song Contest entrants of 1984
Singers from Lisbon
People from Barreiro, Portugal
Eurovision Song Contest entrants for Portugal
20th-century Portuguese women singers
21st-century Portuguese women singers
Deaths from respiratory tract infection